The Oman Royal Yacht Squadron is the Sultan of Oman's personal fleet of pleasure craft ranging from the grand Al Said through to the traditional wooden-hulled sailing vessel Zinat al Bihaar.

The Squadron is totally independent of the Royal Navy of Oman and the Royal Guard of Oman and is administered by the Diwan of Royal Court Affairs.

The Squadron's personnel strength is 150.

Bases
The Oman Royal Yacht Squadron has two permanent operating bases:

 Muscat Harbor adjacent to Fort Mirani: offices, maintenance areas and a slipway
 Muttrah Harbor: specifically dedicated moorings at Port Sultan Qaboos (Mina Sultan Qaboos)

The port of Raysut (near Salalah) will also be a temporary berthing location for the Squadron's vessels when required.

Current inventory
The Squadron operates the following vessels:

See also
 Sultan Qaboos bin Said
 Royal Navy of Oman
 Royal Guard of Oman
 Sultan of Oman's Armed Forces
 List of motor yachts by length

References

External links
Royal Court Affairs
Fleet Monitoring Live Tracking

Ships of Oman